Larry Collmus (born October 13, 1966) is a Thoroughbred horse racing announcer. A native of Baltimore, Collmus has called at numerous racetracks around the country. He is the race caller for NBC Sports' coverage of the Triple Crown and Breeders' Cup. He previously called races at Gulfstream Park, Monmouth Park, Suffolk Downs and NYRA.

Commentary career 
Collmus got his start by calling his first race at Bowie Race Track in 1985 at the age of 18. In 1985 and 1986, he served as the assistant announcer at Laurel Park, Pimlico, Bowie and Timonium Racetrack in his native Maryland. In 1987 he became the youngest announcer in the country after being named to call the races at Birmingham Turf Club in Alabama. After Birmingham, Collmus moved to California and became the announcer at Golden Gate Fields in the San Francisco area, a position he held until 1991 when he moved to take over announcing duties at Suffolk Downs in East Boston, Massachusetts.

Collmus' move to a major summer racing circuit occurred in 1994 when he became the announcer at Monmouth Park, host of the 2007 Breeders' Cup. After spending two years as the winter announcer at Aqueduct, he became the full-time announcer at Gulfstream Park in 2007. In 2011 he succeeded Tom Durkin as the voice of the Triple Crown and Breeders' Cup broadcasts on NBC Sports. He was named track announcer at Churchill Downs beginning with the 2014 racing season. Notably, he called the races from November 19–23, 2008 as one of five potential announcers to replace Luke Kruytbosch.

On August 13, 2014, Collmus was announced to once again succeed Tom Durkin, this time as the voice of the New York Racing Association (NYRA). He began calling the races at Aqueduct, Belmont Park and Saratoga Race Course in April 2015 as part of a five-year contract. He departed NYRA after his contract expired.

Collmus called races at Del Mar in 2020 as regular track announcer Trevor Denman did not attend due to the COVID-19 pandemic. Denman returned in 2021.

Notable calls
Collmus earned national notice when on August 22, 2010, he called a race at Monmouth Park featuring two horses named Mywifenosevrything and Thewifedoesntknow. The two horses made a move on the back stretch and found themselves leading the race, with Collmus playing off the contrasts of the two horses' names in his stretch call: 

Collmus' stretch call attracted worldwide attention and earned hundreds of thousands of views on YouTube.

Collmus has also called races at Saratoga Race Course, Belmont Park, Santa Anita Park, and the Meadowlands as well as numerous races broadcast on ESPN, Fox and CBS.

He had the call for NBC on June 6, 2015, when American Pharoah won the 147th running of the Belmont Stakes, in the process becoming the first Triple Crown winner since Affirmed in 1978: 

He also had the call of the 2015 Breeders' Cup Classic at Keeneland for NBC, where American Pharoah attempted to be racing's first Grand Slam winner:
 

In 2018, Collmus called another Triple Crown win, when Justify won the 150th Belmont Stakes:

References

1966 births
Living people
People from Baltimore
American horse racing announcers
American horse racing commentators